Victory Engineering was a racing team based on Rome, Italy, involved in many areas of motorsport. The team was founded in 2002 by Gabriele De Bono, as part of Carlin Motorsport. In the end of 2007 the team disbanded.

History 
Victory Engineering started competing in Italian Formula 3000/Euro Formula 3000 in 2002. Victory Engineering were involved in the World Series by Renault from 2005 to 2007. Previously the team had raced in the Eurocup Formula Renault V6. In 2007 the team also entered Formula BMW UK.

Results

Euro Formula 3000

Formula Renault V6 Eurocup

World Series by Renault

Formula BMW UK 

Notes:
1. – Entered the championship as Victory by Cram.
2. – Mondini also scored 95 points in 16 races for EuroInternational.

Timeline

References 

Italian auto racing teams
World Series Formula V8 3.5 teams
Formula BMW teams
2002 establishments in Italy
2007 disestablishments in Italy
Auto GP teams
International GT Open teams

Auto racing teams established in 2002
Auto racing teams disestablished in 2007